Cyphoma rhomba is a species of sea snail in the family Ovulidae, the ovulids, cowry allies or false cowries.

Description
The maximum recorded shell length is 22.7 mm.

Habitat
The minimum recorded depth is 18 m. The maximum recorded depth is 18 m.

References

Ovulidae
Gastropods described in 1979